Marilyn Cole (born 7 May 1949) is Playboy magazine's January 1972 Playmate of the Month. She was the magazine's first full-frontal nude centerfold. She also became 1973's Playmate of the Year – the only Briton to hold that title.  Her original pictorial was photographed by Alexas Urba.

Career
Cole worked at a Post Office punched card unit in Portsmouth Central Telephone Exchange, before working for £12 weekly at the Portsmouth Co-op Fuel Office when she was interviewed to be a Playboy Bunny at the London Playboy Club. She worked as a bunny from 1971 to 1974, and within a few days of starting work there was noticed by Victor Lownes and test photographed for the magazine. Marilyn also worked as a barmaid at the Auckland Arms Hotel in Southsea during the late 60s.

She appeared on the cover of the Roxy Music album Stranded, having been noticed by Bryan Ferry after winning Playmate of the Year. She had previously appeared on the covers of various Top of the Pops albums.

Personal life
She was married to former Playboy executive Victor Lownes, over 20 years her senior, until his death in 2017, and now works as a journalist. Among the subjects she writes about is professional boxing, which she began covering in 2000.

Her interests include the tango, which she studied under Paul Pellicoro, and has partnered with actor Brian Cox.

Filmography
 Playboy: 50 Years of Playmates (2004) (V)
 Forty Minutes (1990) TV Episode
 V.I.P.-Schaukel (1972) TV Episode

References

External links
 

Living people
1970s Playboy Playmates
Playboy Playmates of the Year
1949 births
People from Portsmouth
English female models
20th-century English women
20th-century English people